Jacques Bourboulon (born 8 December 1946) is a French photographer, specializing in nude photography. In 1967 he started as a fashion photographer, publishing in Vogue and working for the fashion designers Dior, Féraud, and Carven. In the mid-1970s he switched to nude photography.

Bourboulon's pictures were shot with a Pentax camera and focus on bright light and sharp contrasts. His most typical pictures portray girls and women on the Spanish island of Ibiza, playing on the juxtaposition of blue sky, white walls, and sun-tanned skin.

The most famous model of Jacques Bourboulon has been French actress Eva Ionesco, whom he photographed nude when she was 10.

Photographs by Bourboulon have appeared in such magazines as Playmen in Italy, High Society in its German edition, Club International in the United Kingdom, and Chasseur d'Images and PHOTO in France. They have been distributed online at MET ART and, between 2003 and 2008, at his official site jacques-bourboulon.net.

His 20 photography books sold over 400,000 copies.

He also produced calendars for Pentax and BASF.

Selected Books by Jacques Bourboulon

Conte de Fées, 1980 - Japan: Tatsumi Verlag
Des corps naturels, 1980 - Éditions Filipacchi - 
Eva (portfolio), 1981 - AGEP Ed.
Coquines, 1982 - Kaktus Ed. - 
Attitudes, 1984 - Paris: Carrère - 
Mélodies, 1987 - Paris: JMV - 
Photographier le nu, 1996 - Editions VM -

Selected Magazine Pictorials by Jacques Bourboulon
Club International (UK edition), June 1975
ZOOM (French edition), January–February 1976 (#34)
Playboy (Italian edition), October 1976 - "Classe del 1965!" (pictorial of Eva Ionesco)
Siesta (Spain), #8 (1977)
ZOOM (French edition), July/August 1979 (#64) - "Images de petites filles"
PHOTO (French edition), June 1980 (#153) - "Tendres et naturelles - Jacques Bourboulon : une fête du printemps féminin"
Playmen, July 1980 - "Le 'preferile' di Bourboulon / Vera / Effetto godibilita`"
Photo Cinema Magazine, April 1981 (#18) - "images: la jeune fille de Bourboulon"
Playmen, January 1982 - "Il Paradiso di Bourboulon"
Photo Reporter, November 1982 (#49)
Photo Reporter, November 1984 (#73) - "Les nymphettes impudiques de BOURBOULON"
Lui (German edition), December 1984
Ele e Ela (Brazil), #185 (1984)
Photo Reporter, December 1985 (#86) - "Vive La Fête"
Chasseur d'Images, March 1986 (#80)
Photo Reporter, August 1986 (#94) - "Mes 250 femmes"
High Society (German edition), #8 of 1986 (pictorial of Stephanie)
Rebel Magazine, Fall-Winter 2004/2005 (#8)
Jacques Bourboulon has collaborated with more than 150 magazines in 21 countries throughout the world.

References

French photographers
1946 births
Living people